Charles Antoine Domergue (5 January 1914 in Besançon, France – 31 December 2008 in Antananarivo) was a French naturalist, ornithologist, herpetologist, spelunker and geologist who spent much of his life in Madagascar. He also dealt with the effects of pollution.

Eponyms
Domergue is commemorated in the scientific name of a species of snake, Madatyphlops domerguei, and a frog, Blommersia domerguei, both of which are endemic to Madagascar.

Selected publications
1942: Les serpents de Franche-Comté : Description, habitat, reproduction, venin, chasse, vie en captivité, légendes suivis d'une brève étude des lézards. édition Imprimerie de l'Est (Besançon)
1962: Un serpent venimeux à Madagascar : Madagascarophis colubrina. Bull. Acad. malg. 
1963: Observation sur les hémipénis des ophidiens et sauriens de Madagascar. Bull. Acad. malg., 21–23. 
1967: Clé simplifiée pour la détermination sur le terrain des serpents communs de Madagascar. Bull. Acad. malg. 
1970: Notes sur les Serpents de la Région Malgache. Lycodryas maculatus (Günther, 1858), espèce des Comores. Description de deux femelles. Bull. Mus. Nat. Hist. Nat. Paris, 42 : 449–451.
1972–1973: II. Étude de trois Serpents malgaches : Liopholidophis lateralis (D. & B.), L. stumpffi (Boettger) et L. thieli n. sp. Bull. Mus. Nat. Hist. Nat. Paris, 77 : 1397–1412. 
1973: Notes sur les Caméléons de Madagascar. 
1983: La forêt du PK 32 au nord de Tuléar. Note préliminaire en vue de sa mise en réserve. Bull. Acad. malg., 61 : 105–114
1994: Nouvelles espèces du complexe Stenophis et Lycodrias. Bull. Acad. malg. 21 avril.
1994: Notes sur les serpents de la région malgache. X. Boïginae nouveaux des genres Stenophis et Lycodrias. Bull. Acad. malg.

Decorations
Croix de guerre 1939–1945 
1946: Médaille de la Résistance
1950: Nischan-el-Iftikhar-Orden
July 14, 1967: Legion of Honour

Sources
Domergue, Sylvie (2008). "Travelling Through Time - Voyage dans le temps: Charles A. Domergue". Madagascar Conservation & Development 3 (1): 78–83. (in English and French).

References

1914 births
2008 deaths
French herpetologists
French naturalists
French ornithologists
Scientists from Besançon
20th-century French geologists
20th-century French zoologists
20th-century naturalists